Constitution Hill (foaled 17 March 2017) is a British-bred racehorse that competes in hurdle racing. He recorded his biggest victory when winning the 2023 Champion Hurdle and has been acclaimed as one of the best hurdlers of all time.

References

2017 racehorse births
Racehorses bred in the United Kingdom
Racehorses trained in the United Kingdom
Champion Hurdle winners
Undefeated racehorses